The Col. Thomas Deye Owings House, at Main St. and Courthouse Sq. in Owingsville, Kentucky, was built during 1811–14.  It was listed on the National Register of Historic Places in 1978.

It has also served as a hotel and as a bank, and has been known as the Owings House and as the Owingsville Banking Company Building

It is a prominent building whose design has traditionally been attributed to famous architect Benjamin Latrobe.

References

Hotel buildings on the National Register of Historic Places in Kentucky
Bank buildings on the National Register of Historic Places in Kentucky
Houses on the National Register of Historic Places in Kentucky
Commercial buildings completed in 1814
National Register of Historic Places in Bath County, Kentucky
1814 establishments in Kentucky